Verrucae palmares et plantares is a cutaneous condition characterized by warts on the palms and soles.

See also 
 Plantar wart
 List of cutaneous conditions

References 

Virus-related cutaneous conditions